Sant Salvador de la Vedella is a Benedictine monastery Catalonia, Spain. The Romanesque building is situated near the municipality of Cercs, in Berguedà comarca, province of Barcelona. It was founded by the monks of the Monastery of Sant Serni de Tavèrnoles in the year 830. Carlot Tavèrnoles became the abbot in the 835. After the 12th century its importance declined. Until the year 1580, it was associated with the seminary at La Seu d'Urgell.

Bibliography
 Pladevall, Antoni (2001). Guies Catalunya Romànica, El Berguedà. Barcelona, Portic,  (in Catalan).

External links

 Monasterio de Sant Salvador de la Vedella - Monasterios de Catalunya

Benedictine monasteries in Catalonia
Christian monasteries established in the 9th century
Romanesque architecture in Catalonia
9th-century establishments in Spain
Religious buildings and structures completed in 830